This is a list of all  arcade games developed or published by SNK which predate the Neo Geo, as well as ports.

Games

References

SNK